Wisbech Theatre may refer to:
 Wisbech Electric Theatre, Wisbech, Isle of Ely, Cambridgeshire, England
 Angles Theatre, Wisbech, Isle of Ely, Cambridgeshire, England
 The Wisbech Players, Wisbech, Isle of Ely, Cambridgeshire, England